Le chant des sirènes is the second studio album by French rapper Orelsan, released on 26 September 2011 by 3ème Bureau, 7th Magnitude and Wagram Music.

The album entered the French Albums Chart in third place with 15,529 copies sold in its first week, and is certified double platinum by the SNEP, selling more than 200,000 copies in France to date.

Background
After his debut album Perdu d'avance in 2009, Orelsan said he was "resting on his laurels" and that he had "gone through hard times".

The album is called Le chant des sirènes (French for "the siren's song"), because it is "at an age and in an era where there are many temptations, many addicitions, a lot more than in the time of our grandparents. All my songs talk about it," explains Orelsan. In a similar fashion he explains the title of his album:

Composition
The album deals with what happened in Orelsan's life since his first album. "I did a tour, going into show biz," he explains.

In an interview with Les Inrocks, Orelsan says that he didn't know what to talk about anymore. He explains, "In my first album, I talked about the previous ten years of my life, and at the time I almost never lived at all: I did a tour, sparked a controversy and banged three groupies (laughs)." On his first album, Perdu d'avance, Orelsan wrote fourteen songs without touching up anything, and threw about thirty songs away before finding "this mix of rapping and singing, this mix of myself and someone I'm not." He also says that he introduced more fiction, something that he wouldn't do before. He continues, "I confined myself at home, I went on vacations alone. I was at times very depressed." In another interview, Orelsan explains that the album's title song "Le chant des sirènes" was "a breaking point".

According to the rapper, the song "La petite marchande de porte-clefs" is one that "dragged on for a long time". In finding a subject matter for the song, he explains that he came across a report on the post-Olympic Games in Beijing and what happened to people who were exploited there, and also saw something on the kidnappings of children in China. He says that he imagined "the destiny of a girl my age who would've lived all that."

For the track "1990", which was initially called "Dans les années 1990" ("In the 1990s"), Orelsan wanted to "try and write a track today with references of the time." He says that "in these recent times, there's a tendency of returning to the rap of those years."

Orelsan describes the song "Suicide social", which was released as the album's fourth single on September 15, 2011 before the album's release, as "really a series of clichés", adding that he would have been able to make the song last 4 minutes more. In an interview, he says that talking about people "as groups, as social classes, as layers, is bullshit," and that the song is to be taken as an example of what not to do.

Singles
Le chant des sirènes produced 6 singles:
 "RaelSan" was released as the lead single on 30 May 2011. Its title is a reference to Raël, the founder of Raëlism. It peaked at number 77 on the French Singles Chart, and its music video was nominated for the "Music Video of the Year" award at the 2012 Victoires de la Musique award ceremony.
 "Double vie" was released as a follow-up single to "RaelSan" on 9 June 2011, but never entered the French Singles Chart.
 "Plus rien ne m'étonne" was released as the album's third single on 25 July 2011, peaking at number 46 on the French Singles Chart.
 "Suicide social" was released as the album's fourth single on 15 September 2011. It peaked at number 53 on the French Singles Chart.
 "La terre est ronde" was released as the album's fifth single on 24 December 2011. Peaking at number 9 on the French Singles Chart and at number 15 on Belgium's Wallonian Ultratop 50 Singles Chart, it was nominated for the "Best Song" award at the 2013 edition of the Trace Urban Music Awards.
 "Ils sont cools" was released as the album's sixth single on 22 June 2012. It entered the French Singles Chart at number 143, and peaked at number 66.

Reception

Critical reception and accolades

Le chant des sirènes has received generally positive reviews from music critics. For Éric Mandel of Journal du Dimanche, Orelsan "drives the point home with a stunning song: "Suicide social". It alternates trash humour and existential questions, homage to the origins of rap and the art of storytelling." Musical blog Goûte Mes Disques says, "Le chant des sirènes appears as a light and shade: an album punctuated by some flashes of genius and, unfortunately, also by several tracks that could be described as rather ordinary." Thierry Cadet of Pure Charts says the album is "written in bitterness, sparing no one." He goes on to say that the album's title is "like a satire of our time and the younger generations."

According to Désinvolt, since Orelsan released his first album, "time did its course, the artist came of age and on Le chant des sirènes, the themes approached become more personal, more thoughtful, evolution is assumed until the end and finally it is all of his work which gains depth."

On 3 March 2012, Le chant des sirènes won the Victoire de la Musique award for Urban Music Album of the Year.

Commercial performance
The album entered the French Albums Charts in third place with 15,529 copies sold in its first week, doing much better than Perdu d'avance, which entered in 20th place with 3,365 copies sold. In its second week, Le chant des sirènes went down eight places, finding itself in 11th place with 4,668 more copies sold.

One month after release, Le chant des sirènes was certified gold in France with over 50,000 copies sold. It was certified platinum in 2012 and double platinum in 2018 by the SNEP.

Track listing

Notes
 "Plus rien ne m'étonne" features vocals by Isleym.
 "La petite marchande de porte-clefs" features vocals by Shu Pan.

Personnel
Credits for Le chant des sirènes adapted from Discogs.

 Broad Rush – Producer, instrumentation, programming
 Wahib Chehata – Photography
 Marc Chouarain – Producer, instrumentation, programming
 Cookin' Soul – Producer
 Frédéric Curier – Mixing
 Isleym – Vocals
 Orelsan – Producer, primary artist
 Shu Pan – Vocals
 Félipé Saldivia – Producer, instrumentation
 Fred Savio – Producer, instrumentation, programming
 Skread – Producer, instrumentation, programming
 David Soudan – Mixing
 Dany Synthé – Synthesizer
 David Tomaszewski – Art direction
 Mr Viktor – Scratching

Chart performance

Weekly charts

Year-end charts

Certifications

References

2011 albums
Orelsan albums
French-language albums
7th Magnitude albums
Albums produced by Skread